Pavlovo Bus Factory (formerly , Pavlovsky Avtobusny Zavod or PAZ) is a manufacturer of buses in Russia, in the city of
Pavlovo, Nizhny Novgorod Oblast. PAZ is a subsidiary of Russian Buses which is a division of GAZ.

Pavlovo Bus Factory specializes in designing and manufacturing buses of the small/medium class (length 9.7 m). Buses are the most common plant in Russia, their annual output is over 10 thousand units, almost 80% of small buses in Russia. The small PAZ buses have long been used by Russian "fixed-route taxi" (marshrutka) operators.

Starting in 2015, the GAZ Group has introduced a single brand for all its bus manufacturing subsidiaries, and newly manufactured vehicles now feature the deer badge of the GAZ company.

History
The factory has its origins in the ZATI automobile and tractor tool plant, established in Pavlovo in 1932. The building of the factory started in 1952, and in the same year the first PAZ-651 long-hood buses (based on the GAZ-51 general-purpose lorry) were produced. The government had a plan to produce 10,000 buses per year. In 1960, the production of new PAZ-652 forward control model on the same chassis started. It was replaced by the outwardly similar PAZ-672 (based on the GAZ-53 lorry) in early 1968, and this bus had a large family of various modifications. 1989 saw a start of production of the new PAZ-3205 model having basically the same chassis but a completely new body.

Models

Current
 PAZ-3205 (1989–present)
 PAZ-3206 (1995–present)
 PAZ-3237 "Luzhok" (2002–present)
 PAZ-4234 (2003–present)
 PAZ-3203 (2006–present)
 PAZ-3204 (2006–present)
 PAZ Vector 4 (2012–present)
 PAZ Vector 3 (2015–present)
 GAZ Vector Next (2016–present)

Former
 PAZ-651 (1950-1961, based on GAZ-51I)
 PAZ-651A (1961-1971)
 PAZ-652 (1958-1968)
 PAZ-653 (1950–1956, ambulance version of PAZ-651)
 PAZ-655 (1954–?, armored van version of PAZ-651)
 PAZ-657 (1954–1958, bread van version of PAZ-651)
 PAZ-661 (1954–1956, clothing van version of PAZ-651)
 PAZ-661B
 PAZ-672 (1967-1989)
 PAZ-3201 (1972-1989, based on GAZ-66)
 PAZ-5272 (1999-2003)
 PAZ-4230 Aurora (2001-2002, production moved to KAvZ)
 PAZ-4238 Aurora (2001-2002, production moved to KAvZ)
 PAZ Real (2007-2009)

Panel vans
 PAZ-657 (1954–1958, based on GAZ-51)
 PAZ-659

Trailers
 PAZ-658
 PAZ-740
 PAZ-742
 PAZ-743
 PAZ-744
 PAZ-746
 PAZ-750

Prototypes
 PAZ-665 (1964)
 PAZ-671 (1958, based on GAZ-52)
 PAZ-671A (1958, based on GAZ-53)
 PAZ-671G (based on GAZ-52A)
 PAZ-675 (1960, based on GAZ-52)
 PAZ-985 (1960)
 PAZ-3202 (1973)
 PAZ-3203 (1972)
 PAZ-3204 (1974)

Around the world 
One PAZ-672 came to Chile between 1970 and 1971 with the installation of the soviet KPD factory of concrete blocks for prefabricated buildings, in Quilpué . This was one of the many symbols of the relation between the Soviet Union and the Unidad Popular government in Chile.

Gallery

References

External links

 JSC "Pavlovo Bus"

Bus manufacturers of Russia
Bus manufacturers of the Soviet Union
GAZ Group
Russian brands
Buildings and structures in Nizhny Novgorod Oblast
Companies based in Nizhny Novgorod Oblast
Companies listed on the Moscow Exchange